Bobovica may refer to:

 Bobovica, Bosnia and Herzegovina, a village near Trnovo
 Bobovica (river), right tributary of the Vrbanja river in Bosnia and Herzegovina
 Bobovica, Croatia, a village near Samobor